Kand-e Qoli Khan (also Romanized as Kand-e Qolī Khān) is a village in Kohanabad Rural District, Kohanabad District, Aradan County, Semnan Province, Iran. At the 2006 census, its population was 775, in 225 families.

References 

Populated places in Aradan County